A Low Cab Forward (LCF) truck is a type of cab over or cab forward truck with a low cab height and greater ease of entry.  They are typically light duty or medium duty, as opposed to a heavy-duty cab-over truck such as a tractor unit, This contrasts with a conventional truck where the engine is mounted in front of the driver.

Light duty
Avia D
Chevrolet Express
Isuzu N-series (NPR, NQR, NRR, etc.)
Mitsubishi Fuso Canter
GMC W4 Forward 
Chevrolet 4500 HD, 5500 HD, 6500 HD/XD LCF
Hyundai Mighty
Hyundai Porter
Hyundai HD45
Hyundai HD65/HD72/HD78
Dodge Sprinter
Ram pickup 3500
Kia Bongo
Mazda Titan
UD Trucks series (1400 1800HD, 1800CS, etc.)
Hino Dutro
Hino series (145, 165, 185, etc.)
Toyota Dyna
Tata LPT 613

Medium duty
DAF LF
Ford Cargo
Ford LCF, International CF600
GMC W6/W7 Forward
Hino Ranger
Hyundai HD120/HD210
Hyundai Mega Truck
Hyundai Pavise
Isuzu Forward
Iveco EuroCargo
Mercedes-Benz Atego
Mitsubishi Fuso Fighter
MAN TGL
MAN TGM
Nissan Diesel Condor
Renault Midlum
Renault Trucks D
Scania L, P series
Volvo FL
Volvo FE

Heavy duty

Mercedes-Benz Actros
Isuzu Giga
Renault Premium
Renault Trucks T
UD Quon
Mitsubishi Fuso Super Great
Hyundai Xcient
DAF CF
DAF XF
Scania G-series
Scania R-series
Renault Trucks K
Renault Trucks C
Hino Profia
Volvo FH
Iveco Stralis
Iveco Trakker
Hyundai Trago
MAN TGS
MAN TGA 
MAN TGX
Iveco S-Way
Volvo FM
Volvo FMX
Mercedes-Benz Arocs
Ford F-MAX
Renault Kerax

See also
 List of trucks
 Cab over

References

Truck-related lists